Lajja Ram Tomar or Lajjaram Tomar was a schoolteacher and educationist.  He was the head of Vidya Bharati, the education wing of Rashtriya Swayamsevak Sangh (RSS), from 1979 until his death in 2004.

Life and career 
Tomar was born on 21 July 1930 in a peasant family. He studied in a Baptist Mission School in Agra and joined the RSS as a swayamsevak from his childhood.  He received M. A. and B.Ed. degrees and worked as a lecturer.

In 1957, he founded the Saraswati Shishu Mandir in Agra, working as its principal.  In 1961, he founded a Saraswati Vidya Mandir, senior secondary school in the RSS schools network. In 1972, he was appointed as the secretary of the entire schools network of RSS in Uttar Pradesh, called the Bharatiya Siksha Sansthan. He became an RSS pracharak in 1977 and was appointed as the Organisational Secretary of Vidya Bharati, the all-India schools network of the RSS, in 1979.  He worked from its registered office in Lucknow.

In 1990, he was promoted as the Rashtriya Margadarshak (National Guide) of Vidya Bharati, with Dinanath Batra succeeding him as the Organisational Secretary.  In the new role, he worked from the Sanskriti Bhavan in Kurukshetra, until his death in 2004.

Ideas

Superiority of "ancient Hindu knowledge"
In The Path of Vidya Bharati Thought, Tomar claims that ancient Hindu knowledge predated Western scientific advances; that Rigvedic verses provide the speed of light, Samkhya scholars dated the universe to 2 billion years old, and sage Bharadwaja wrote a text on aviation engineering.

Reception
Tomar's views have been criticised. According to Akshay Bakaya:

Bakaya goes on to say that:

Publications 
 Vidya Bharti Chintan Ki Disha (The Path of Vidya Bharati Thought, 2001), Kurukshetra:Vidya Bharati.
 Pracheen Bhartiya Shiksha Paddhati (The education methods of ancient India, 2014), Suruchi Prakashan, .
 Bhartiya Shiksha ke Mool Tatva (The philosophy of Indian education, 2014), Suruchi Prakashan, .

Note

References

Sources

External links
 

Indian schoolteachers
Rashtriya Swayamsevak Sangh pracharaks
20th-century Indian educational theorists
Scholars from Haryana